Moses M. Weinstein (July 8, 1912 – November 30, 2007) was an American lawyer and politician.

Name
He was born Morris Weinstein without a middle initial. A playbill for a production at Brooklyn College added erroneously the middle initial, and a mistaken inscription of his degree at Brooklyn Law School changed Morris to Moses which name he adopted henceforth.

Life
He was born on July 8, 1912, in New York City, the son of a tailor, and grew up on the Lower East Side, Manhattan. He graduated from Thomas Jefferson High School at 15, but it took him seven years and a dozen jobs to work his way through college and law school.

In 1941, he married Muriel Marshall (d. 2006). They had three sons who all graduated from Brooklyn Law School too: Jeremy Weinstein, a New York Supreme Court justice and State Senator; Jonathan Weinstein; and Peter Weinstein, a Circuit Court judge in Broward County, Fla.

In World War II, he was an infantry corporal and fought in the Battle of the Bulge.

He was a member of the New York State Assembly from 1959 to 1969, sitting in the 172nd, 173rd, 174th, 175th, 176th, 177th and 178th New York State Legislatures. He was Majority Leader from 1965 to 1968, and as such became Acting Speaker for the remainder of the year upon the resignation of Speaker Anthony J. Travia after the close of the legislative session in 1968.

He was Chairman of the Queens Democratic Party from 1962 to 1969, and was Majority Leader of the New York State Constitutional Convention of 1967.

In August 1968, Weinstein, who as Acting Speaker was fourth in line for the governorship, became Acting Governor of New York for 10 days when Governor Nelson Rockefeller, Lieutenant Governor Malcolm Wilson and Temporary President of the Senate Earl W. Brydges went to the 1968 Republican National Convention in Miami Beach, Florida.

Weinstein was an ally of Mayor of New York Robert F. Wagner in the early 1960s and had a good relationship with Governor Rockefeller. Weinstein sponsored measures that created the Urban Development Corporation and the Crime Victims Compensation Board, reformed divorce and welfare laws, established a consumer bill of rights, increased aid for air-pollution controls and Regents scholarships, and promoted hospital expansion. He supported rent controls, veterans rights, aid to small businesses and antidiscrimination laws.

In November 1969, he was elected to the New York Supreme Court. In a 1973 case, acknowledging he might be violating the law, he vacated the three-year term of a woman convicted of selling drugs, noting that she had terminal cancer and less than a year to live.

In 1980, he was appointed to the New York Supreme Court, Appellate Division, Second Department, with jurisdiction over Queens, Brooklyn, Staten Island and seven suburban counties. He participated in rulings that threw out unjust convictions, invalidated school financing based on property taxes and decided many other controversies. He left the bench at the end of 1988 after reaching the constitutional age limit.

He died on November 30, 2007, in Memorial Hospital in Pembroke Pines, Broward County, Florida.

Sources
 Obit in NYT on December 3, 2007, with photo
 Mourning notice by Brooklyn Law School, in NYT on December 4, 2007

1912 births
2007 deaths
Jewish American military personnel
United States Army personnel of World War II
Jewish American state legislators in New York (state)
Speakers of the New York State Assembly
Democratic Party members of the New York State Assembly
Politicians from Queens, New York
Brooklyn College alumni
Brooklyn Law School alumni
20th-century American politicians
United States Army soldiers
20th-century American Jews
21st-century American Jews